MLW Fightland is a professional wrestling supercard event produced by Major League Wrestling (MLW). The event was first held in 2018 as a television taping for MLW's weekly program, Fusion.

Dates and venues

References

Fightland
Recurring events established in 2018